Chune Pattapong (born 1927) was a Thai boxer. He competed in the men's light welterweight event at the 1956 Summer Olympics.

References

External links
  

1927 births
Possibly living people
Chune Pattapong
Chune Pattapong
Boxers at the 1956 Summer Olympics
Place of birth missing
Light-welterweight boxers